The From Here to Now to You Tour is the sixth concert tour by American recording artist Jack Johnson. The album promotes Johnson's sixth studio album, From Here to Now to You (2013). The tour played over 80 shows in Europe, the Americas, Australasia and Asia.

Opening acts
Bahamas 
Edward Sharpe and the Magnetic Zeros 
Amos Lee 
Michael Kiwanuka 
Animal Liberation Orchestra

Setlist
The following setlist was obtained the concert held on October 19, 2013; at the Orpheum Theatre in Los Angeles, California. It does not represent all concerts for the duration of the tour. 
"Do You Remember"
"Good People"
"As I Was Saying"
"Washing Dishes"
"Taylor"
"Flake"
"Tomorrow Morning"
"Bubble Toes" / "The Joker" / "At or with Me" / "Crosstown Traffic"
"Wasting Time"
"If I Had Eyes"
"Inaudible Melodies"
"Radiate"
"Don't Believe a Thing I Say"
"Breakdown"
"Tape Deck"
"Banana Pancakes"
"Shot Reverse Shot"
"Sitting, Waiting, Wishing" 
"Staple It Together"
"Mudfootball"
Encore
"I Got You"
"Country Road"
"Turn Your Love"
"Better Together"
"Home"

Tour dates

Festivals and other miscellaneous performances

This concert was a part of "Radio 2 Live in Hyde Park"
This concert was a part of the "iTunes Festival"
This concert was a part of "Farm Aid"
This concert was a part of the "Life is Good Festival"
This concert was a part of "Movistar Free Music"
This concert was a part of "Cumbre Tajín"
This concert was a part of the "Byron Bay Bluesfest"
This concert was a part of the "Hangout Music Festival"
This concert was a part of "Boston Calling"
This concert was a part of "Celebrate Brooklyn!"
This concert was a part of the "Firefly Music Festival"
This concert was a part of the "Calling Festival"
This concert was a part of "Rock Werchter"
This concert was a part of the "Main Square Festival"
This concert was a part of the "Festival de Poupet"
This concert was a part of "Bilbao BBK Live"
This concert was a part of "Festival Cruïlla"
This concert was a part of the "Pistoia Blues Festival"
This concert was a part of "Moon and Stars"
This concert was a part of the "Somersault Festival"
This concert was a part of the "Paléo Festival"
This concert was a part of the "Fuji Rock Festival"

Box office score data

References

2013 concert tours
2014 concert tours